Social networking is one of the most active web-based activities in the Philippines, with Filipinos being declared as the most active users on a number of web-based social media sites such as Facebook, Instagram, Snapchat, and Twitter. The use of social networking website has become so extensive in the Philippines that the country has been tagged as "The Social Media Capital of the World," and has also become part of Filipino Internet culture. Subsequently, social media is also used in the Philippines as a form of election campaign material, as well as tools to aid criminal investigation.

History
Friendster is one of the first social networking websites in the World Wide Web when it was introduced in 2002. However, its popularity in the United States plummeted quickly in 2004 due to massive technical problems and server delays. But as it was losing its American audience, Friendster slowly gained users from Southeast Asia starting in the Philippines. Friendster director of engineering Chris Lunt wondered why its web traffic was spiking in the middle of the night, and noticed that the traffic was coming from the Philippines. He then traced the trail to a Filipino-American marketing consultant and hypnotist named Carmen Leilani de Jesus as the first user to have introduced Friendster to the Philippines, where a number of her friends live.

Statistics

A study released by Universal McCann entitled "Power to the People – Wave3" declared the Philippines as "the social networking capital of the world," with 83 percent of Filipinos surveyed are members of a social network. They are also regarded as the top photo uploaders and web video viewers, while they are second when it comes to the number of blog readers and video uploaders.

With over 7.9 million Filipinos using the Internet, 6.9 million of them visit a social networking site at least once a month. At times, Friendster has been the most visited website in the Philippines, as well as in Indonesia, according to web tracking site Alexa. David Jones, vice president for global marketing of Friendster, said that "the biggest percentage of (their site's) users is from the Philippines, clocking in with 39 percent of the site's traffic." He further added that in March 2008 alone, Friendster recorded 39 million unique visitors, with 13.2 million of whom were from the Philippines. Meanwhile, Multiply president and founder Peter Pezaris said that the Filipino users of their site comprised the largest and most active group in terms of number of subscribers and of photographs being uploaded daily. About 2.2 million out of more than nine million registered users of Multiply are Filipinos, outnumbering even nationalities with a bigger population base like the United States, Indonesia, and Brazil. Also, one million photographs are uploaded by Filipinos to Multiply every day, which is half of their total number worldwide.

Sixty percent of Filipino users of Multiply are female, while 70 percent are under the age of 25. In comparison, Filipino Friendster users are between the ages 16 to 30, with 55 percent of them female.

Application in Filipino culture and society
The popularity of social networking in the Philippines can be traced in the Filipinos' culture of "friends helping friends." For Filipinos, their friends and who they know can become more valuable than money, especially when what they need can be achieved through nepotism, favoritism, and friendship among others.

Social networking has extensive uses in the Philippines. It was used to promote television programs like Pinoy Big Brother: Teen Edition Plus with its two profiles on Multiply. A call center company posted job openings on its Multiply community site and was able to attract recruits. The power of social networking was tested in the country's 2007 general elections when senatorial candidate Francis Escudero created his own Friendster profile to bolster support from Filipino users. He eventually won a seat in the Senate. Local celebrities and politicians have since created their own profiles on Friendster as their medium to communicate with their fans and constituents.

Friendster was also used as a tool for police investigations. Local police in Cebu City were able to track down the suspects for the robbery and murder of a female nursing student in March 2008. After receiving information and tips from the public and other police operatives, the local police searched through the suspects' profiles in order to get a closer look at their faces. The police printed the pictures of the suspects and launched a series of police operations, which led to their arrest. Meanwhile, Manila Police District arrested a suspect for the murder of two guest relations officers in Tondo in January 2007 after they were able to find the suspect's whereabouts through his Friendster profile.

Social networks also became a source of high-profile cyberwars, notably between actors Ynez Veneracion and Mon Confiado against Juliana Palermo. The two accused Palermo of creating a fake Friendster profile of her ex-boyfriend Confiado, which is uploaded with photos of Confiado and his girlfriend Veneracion but laden with profanities in each caption.

For his bid for the Philippine Presidency in May 2010, then Secretary of National Defense, Gilberto Teodoro launched an aggressive campaign via the social media. He capitalized on networks such as YouTube and Facebook. He reportedly spent nearly a quarter of his campaign budget on the social media in the Philippines; in comparison to the 15th Philippine president's Benigno Simeon Aquino III – 9%.

Criticism
Filipino-American Internet personality Christine Gambito, also known as HappySlip, criticized Friendster for displaying what she described as "inappropriate advertisements" that appear on her profile. She posted a message on the site's bulletin board addressing her fans that she contemplated deleting her account. Gambito had earlier deleted her MySpace account because she objected to the Google-powered online advertisements that she said "were in direct conflict with the HappySlip brand and especially misrepresentative of Filipino women." She particularly criticized the posting of advertisements of international dating websites that supposedly target Filipinas.

Meanwhile, Philippine National Police Director General Avelino Razon ordered the Criminal Investigation and Detection Group to find out who created a fake account on Friendster using his identity. The profile was laden with false information about him, saying that he "wants to meet traitors, corrupts, criminals so he could crush them."

As of December 2008, there have been cases of spam comments in Friendster profiles, most of which are in the form of a JPEG image masquerading as an embedded YouTube video, with a thumbnail of a sexually explicit video clip, such as a girl undressing herself or something similar. Clicking on the image usually results in a redirect to a dubious or disreputable website, or worse, a drive-by download of malware, such as the Koobface worm. Because some of the users, especially teenagers, who usually log on to the site in an Internet café, have only limited knowledge about malware and/or computers in general, such social engineering attacks can be a significant risk. The site had received considerable criticism due to this issue.

New Campaign
In July 2011, GMA Network creates the new campaign Think Before You Click – a campaign by GMA News to promote responsible use of social media.
In August 2016, Rappler initiates the campaign "#NoPlaceForHate" – a campaign that encourages civility when engaging online.

References 

Technology in society
Internet in the Philippines